Indigo dye is an organic compound with a distinctive blue color.Indigo is a natural dye extracted from the leaves of some plants of the Indigofera genus, in particular Indigofera tinctoria; dye-bearing Indigofera plants were commonly grown and used throughout the world, in Asia in particular, as an important crop, with the production of indigo dyestuff economically important due to the previous rarity of some blue dyestuffs historically.

Most indigo dye produced today is synthetic, constituting several thousand tons each year. It is most commonly associated with the production of denim cloth and blue jeans, where its properties allow for effects such as stone washing and acid washing to be applied quickly.

Uses

Smaller quantities are used in the dyeing of wool and silk.

Indigo carmine, also known as indigo, is an indigo derivative which is also used as a colorant. About 20,000 tonnes are produced annually, again mainly for the production of blue jeans. It is also used as a food colorant, and is listed in the United States as FD&C Blue No. 2.

Sources

Natural sources

A variety of plants have provided indigo throughout history, but most natural indigo was obtained from those in the genus Indigofera, which are native to the tropics, notably the Indian Subcontinent. The primary commercial indigo species in Asia was true indigo (Indigofera tinctoria, also known as I. sumatrana). A common alternative used in the relatively colder subtropical locations such as Japan's  Islands and Taiwan is Strobilanthes cusia. 

Until the introduction of Indigofera species from the south, Polygonum tinctorum (dyer's knotweed) was the most important blue dyestuff in East Asia; however, the crop produced less dyestuff than the average crop of indigo, and was quickly surpassed in favour of the more economical Indigofera tinctoria plant. In Central and South America, the species grown is Indigofera suffruticosa, also known as anil, and in India, an important species was Indigofera arrecta, Natal indigo. In Europe, Isatis tinctoria, commonly known as woad, was used for dyeing fabrics blue, containing the same dyeing compounds as indigo, also referred to as indigo.

Several plants contain indigo, which, when exposed to an oxidising source such as atmospheric oxygen, reacts to produce indigo dye; however, the relatively low concentrations of indigo in these plants make them difficult to work with, with the color more easily tainted by other dye substances also present in these plants, typically leading to a greenish tinge.

The precursor to indigo is indican, a colorless, water-soluble derivative of the amino acid tryptophan. Indican readily hydrolyzes to release β--glucose and indoxyl. Oxidation by exposure to air converts indoxyl to indigotin, the insoluble blue chemical that is the endpoint of indigo dye. Indican was obtained from the processing of the plant's leaves, which contain as much as 0.2–0.8% of this compound. The leaves were soaked in water and fermented to convert the glycoside indican present in the plant to indigotin. They precipitate from the fermented leaf solution when mixed with a strong base such as lye, pressed into cakes, dried, and powdered. The powder was then mixed with various other substances to produce different shades of blue and purple.

Natural sources of indigo also include mollusks; the Murex genus of sea snails produces a mixture of indigo and 6,6′-dibromoindigo (red), which together produce a range of purple hues known as Tyrian purple. Light exposure during part of the dyeing process can convert the dibromoindigo into indigo, resulting in blue hues known as royal blue, hyacinth purple, or tekhelet.

Chemical synthesis

Given its economic importance, indigo has been prepared by many methods. The Baeyer-Drewson indigo synthesis dates back to 1882. It involves an aldol condensation of o-nitrobenzaldehyde with acetone, followed by cyclization and oxidative dimerization to indigo. This route is highly useful for obtaining indigo and many of its derivatives on the laboratory scale, but proved impractical for industrial-scale synthesis. Johannes Pfleger and  eventually came up with industrial mass production synthesis. 

The first commercially practical route of producing indigo is credited to Pfleger in 1901. In this process, N-phenylglycine is treated with a molten mixture of sodium hydroxide, potassium hydroxide, and sodamide. This highly sensitive melt produces indoxyl, which is subsequently oxidized in air to form indigo. Variations of this method are still in use today. An alternative and also viable route to indigo is credited to Heumann in 1897. The process is easier than the Pfleger method, but the precursors are more expensive. Indoxyl-2-carboxylic acid is generated. This material readily decarboxylates to give indoxyl, which oxidizes in air to form indigo. The preparation of indigo dye is practised in college laboratory classes according to the original Baeyer-Drewsen route.

History

The oldest known fabric dyed indigo, dated to 6,000 years ago, was discovered in Huaca Prieta, Peru. Many Asian countries, such as India, China, Japan, and Southeast Asian nations have used indigo as a dye (particularly for silk) for centuries. The dye was also known to ancient civilizations in Mesopotamia, Egypt, Britain, Mesoamerica, Peru, Iran, and West Africa. Indigo was also cultivated in India, which was also the earliest major center for its production and processing. The Indigofera tinctoria species was domesticated in India. Indigo, used as a dye, made its way to the Greeks and the Romans, where it was valued as a luxury product.

In Mesopotamia, a neo-Babylonian cuneiform tablet of the seventh century BC gives a recipe for the dyeing of wool, where lapis-colored wool (uqnatu) is produced by repeated immersion and airing of the cloth. Indigo was most probably imported from India. The Romans used indigo as a pigment for painting and for medicinal and cosmetic purposes. It was a luxury item imported to the Mediterranean from India by Arab merchants.

India was a primary supplier of indigo to Europe as early as the Greco-Roman era. The association of India with indigo is reflected in the Greek word for the dye, indikón (Indian). The Romans latinized the term to indicum, which passed into Italian dialect and eventually into English as the word indigo.

In Bengal indigo cultivators revolted against exploitative working conditions created by European merchants and planters in what became known as the Indigo revolt in 1859. The Bengali play Nil Darpan by Indian playwright Dinabandhu Mitra was a fictionalized retelling of the revolt.

The demand for indigo in the 19th century is indicated by the fact that in 1897,  were dedicated to the cultivation of indican-producing plants, mainly in India.

In Europe, indigo remained a rare commodity throughout the Middle Ages. A chemically identical dye derived from the woad plant (Isatis tinctoria) was used instead. In the late 15th century, the Portuguese explorer Vasco da Gama discovered a sea route to India. This led to the establishment of direct trade with India, the Spice Islands, China, and Japan. Importers could now avoid the heavy duties imposed by Persian, Levantine, and Greek middlemen and the lengthy and dangerous land routes which had previously been used. Consequently, the importation and use of indigo in Europe rose significantly. Much European indigo from Asia arrived through ports in Portugal, the Netherlands, and England. Many indigo plantations were established by European powers in tropical climates. Spain imported the dye from its colonies in Central and South America, and it was a major crop in Haiti and Jamaica, with much or all of the labor performed by enslaved Africans and African Americans. In the Spanish colonial era, intensive production of indigo for the world market in the region of modern El Salvador entailed such unhealthy conditions that the local indigenous population, forced to labor in pestilential conditions, was decimated. Indigo plantations also thrived in the Virgin Islands. However, France and Germany outlawed imported indigo in the 16th century to protect the local woad dye industry.

Newton used "indigo" to describe one of the two new primary colors he added to the five he had originally named, in his revised account of the rainbow in Lectiones Opticae of 1675.

Because of its high value as a trading commodity, indigo was often referred to as blue gold.

Throughout West Africa, Indigo was the foundation of centuries-old textile traditions. From the Tuareg nomads of the Sahara to Cameroon, clothes dyed with indigo signified wealth. Women dyed the cloth in most areas, with the Yoruba of Nigeria and the Mandinka of Mali particularly well known for their expertise. Among the Hausa male dyers, working at communal dye pits was the basis of the wealth of the ancient city of Kano, and they can still be seen plying their trade today at the same pits. The Tuareg are sometimes called the "Blue People" because the indigo pigment in the cloth of their traditional robes and turbans stained their skin dark blue. 

In Japan, indigo became especially important during the Edo period. This was due to a growing textiles industry, and because commoners had been banned from wearing silk, leading to the increasing cultivation of cotton, and consequently indigo – one of the few substances that could dye it.

In North America, indigo was introduced into colonial South Carolina by Eliza Lucas, where it became the colony's second-most important cash crop (after rice). As a major export crop, indigo supported plantation slavery there. In the May and June 1755 issues of The Gentleman's Magazine, there appeared a detailed account of the cultivation of indigo, accompanied by drawings of necessary equipment and a prospective budget for starting such an operation, authored by South Carolina planter Charles Woodmason. It later appeared as a book.   By 1775, indigo production in South Carolina exceeded 1,222,000 pounds.  When Benjamin Franklin sailed to France in November 1776 to enlist France's support for the American Revolutionary War, 35 barrels of indigo were on board the Reprisal, the sale of which would help fund the war effort. In colonial North America, three commercially important species are found: the native I. caroliniana, and the introduced I. tinctoria and I. suffruticosa.

Synthetic development

In 1865 the German chemist Adolf von Baeyer began working on the synthesis of indigo. He described his first synthesis of indigo in 1878 (from isatin) and a second synthesis in 1880 (from 2-nitrobenzaldehyde). (It was not until 1883 that Baeyer finally determined the structure of indigo.) The synthesis of indigo remained impractical, so the search for alternative starting materials at Badische Anilin- und Soda-Fabrik (BASF) and Hoechst continued. Johannes Pfleger and Karl Heumann eventually came up with industrial mass production synthesis.

The synthesis of N-(2-carboxyphenyl)glycine from the easy to obtain aniline provided a new and economically attractive route. BASF developed a commercially feasible manufacturing process that was in use by 1897, at which time 19,000 tons of indigo were being produced from plant sources. This had dropped to 1,000 tons by 1914 and continued to contract. By 2011, 50,000 tons of synthetic indigo were being produced worldwide.

Dyeing technology

Indigo white
Indigo is a challenging dye because it is not soluble in water. To be dissolved, it must undergo a chemical change (reduction). Reduction converts indigo into "white indigo" (leuco-indigo). When a submerged fabric is removed from the dyebath, the white indigo quickly combines with oxygen in the air and reverts to the insoluble, intensely colored indigo. When it first became widely available in Europe in the 16th century, European dyers and printers struggled with indigo because of this distinctive property. It also required several chemical manipulations, some involving toxic materials, and presented many opportunities to injure workers. In the 19th century, English poet William Wordsworth referred to the plight of indigo dye workers of his hometown of Cockermouth in his autobiographical poem The Prelude. Speaking of their dire working conditions and the empathy that he felt for them, he wrote:

A pre-industrial process for production of indigo white, used in Europe, was to dissolve the indigo in stale urine, which contains ammonia. A more convenient reductive agent is zinc. Another pre-industrial method, used in Japan, was to dissolve the indigo in a heated vat in which a culture of thermophilic, anaerobic bacteria was maintained. Some species of such bacteria generate hydrogen as a metabolic product, which convert insoluble indigo into soluble indigo white. Cloth dyed in such a vat was decorated with the techniques of shibori (tie-dye), kasuri, katazome, and tsutsugaki. Examples of clothing and banners dyed with these techniques can be seen in the works of Hokusai and other artists.

Direct printing
Two different methods for the direct application of indigo were developed in England in the 18th century and remained in use well into the 19th century. The first method, known as 'pencil blue' because it was most often applied by pencil or brush, could be used to achieve dark hues. Arsenic trisulfide and a thickener were added to the indigo vat. The arsenic compound delayed the oxidation of the indigo long enough to paint the dye onto fabrics.

The second method was known as 'China blue' due to its resemblance to Chinese blue-and-white porcelain. Instead of using an indigo solution directly, the process involved printing the insoluble form of indigo onto the fabric. The indigo was then reduced in a sequence of baths of iron(II) sulfate, with air oxidation between each immersion. The China blue process could make sharp designs, but it could not produce the dark hues possible with the pencil blue method.

Around 1880, the 'glucose process' was developed. It finally enabled the direct printing of indigo onto fabric and could produce inexpensive dark indigo prints unattainable with the China blue method.

Since 2004, freeze-dried indigo, or instant indigo, has become available. In this method, the indigo has already been reduced, and then freeze-dried into a crystal. The crystals are added to warm water to create the dye pot. As in a standard indigo dye pot, care has to be taken to avoid mixing in oxygen. Freeze-dried indigo is simple to use, and the crystals can be stored indefinitely as long as they are not exposed to moisture.

Chemical properties

It is insoluble in water, alcohol, or ether, but soluble in DMSO, chloroform, nitrobenzene, and concentrated sulfuric acid. The chemical formula of indigo is C16H10N2O2.

The molecule absorbs light in the orange part of the spectrum (λmax = 613 nm). The compound owes its deep color to the conjugation of the double bonds, i.e. the double bonds within the molecule are adjacent and the molecule is planar. In indigo white, the conjugation is interrupted because the molecule is non-planar.

Indigo derivatives

The benzene rings in indigo can be modified to give a variety of related dyestuffs. Thioindigo, where the two NH groups are replaced by S atoms, is deep red. Tyrian purple is a dull purple dye that is secreted by a common Mediterranean snail. It was highly prized in antiquity. In 1909, its structure was shown to be 6,6'-dibromoindigo (red). 6-bromoindigo (purple) is a component as well. It has never been produced on a commercial basis. The related Ciba blue (5,7,5′,7′-tetrabromoindigo) is, however, of commercial value. 

Indigo and its derivatives featuring intra- and intermolecular hydrogen bonding have very low solubility in organic solvents. They can be made soluble using transient protecting groups such as the tBOC group, which suppresses intermolecular bonding. Heating of the tBOC indigo results in efficient thermal deprotection and regeneration of the parent H-bonded pigment.

Treatment with sulfuric acid converts indigo into a blue-green derivative called indigo carmine (sulfonated indigo). It became available in the mid-18th century. It is used as a colorant for food, pharmaceuticals, and cosmetics.

Indigo as an organic semiconductor
Indigo and some of its derivatives are known to be ambipolar organic semiconductors when deposited as thin films by vacuum evaporation.

Safety and the environment
In 2009, large spills of blue dyes had been reported downstream of a blue jeans manufacturer in Lesotho.

The compound has been found to act as an agonist of the aryl hydrocarbon receptor.

References

Further reading

Paul, Jenny Balfour. 2020. “Indigo and Blue: A Marriage Made in Heaven.” Textile Museum Journal 47 (January): 160–85.

External links 
Plant Cultures: botany, history and uses of indigo
FD&C regulation on indigotine

Indigo structure dyes
Organic pigments
Indolines
Enones